HMS Athlete (W 150) was a  of the Royal Navy during World War II.

Service history 
Athlete was laid down in early 1943 at Levingston Shipbuilding Company in Orange, Texas as ATR-92, launched 18 May 1943 and commissioned into the Royal Navy under the Lend-Lease Act on 15 November 1943. Athlete served in the Mediterranean Fleet and was mined and sunk off Leghorn on 17 July 1945.

References 

 

1943 ships
Favourite-class tugboats
Ships built in Orange, Texas
Ships sunk by mines
Shipwrecks in the Mediterranean Sea
Maritime incidents in July 1945